Indians in the New York City metropolitan area constitute one of the largest and fastest-growing ethnicities in the New York City metropolitan area of the United States. The New York City region is home to the largest and most prominent Indian American population among metropolitan areas by a significant margin, enumerating 711,174 uniracial individuals by the 2013–2017 U.S. Census American Community Survey estimates. The Asian Indian population also represents the second-largest metropolitan Asian national diaspora both outside of Asia and within the New York City metropolitan area, following the also rapidly growing and hemisphere-leading population of the estimated 893,697 uniracial Chinese in the New York City metropolitan area in 2017.
The U.S. state of New Jersey, most of whose population is situated within the New York City metropolitan region, has by a significant margin the highest proportional Indian population concentration of any U.S. state, with a Census-estimated 4.1% of New Jersey's population being an individual of Indian origin in 2017.

History

The first Indian to become a naturalized U.S. citizen was Bhicaji Balsara, a resident of New York. However, this was after the Luce–Celler Act of 1946 that restored naturalization rights to Indian Americans in the United States. A number of Indian Americans came to the U.S. via Indian communities from other countries, including the United Kingdom, Canada, South Africa, Mauritius, Malaysia, Singapore, Suriname, Guyana, Trinidad and Tobago, Fiji, Kenya, Tanzania, Uganda, and Jamaica. The quota on Indian immigration was removed in the 1960s, leading to exponential growth in the number of Indian immigrants to the United States. While Indians prior to this time were primarily involved in agricultural endeavors or constructing railroads in the western United States, by the 1960s, there was a small Manhattan-based Indian community consisting of graduate students in Columbia University and New York University, diplomatic attachés at the United Nations and Indian corporate workers. However, the largest number hereafter came to New York City and its affluent suburban environs, consisting largely of professionals, including physicians, engineers, financiers, scientists, entrepreneurs, and lawyers, as well as businesspeople. By 1974, there was a notable Indian population in the greater New York area, with particular concentrations in Hoboken, New Jersey and Flushing, Queens, though neither was strongly identified as a Little India at this point and there was already a push to move out to the suburbs, especially to Nassau County on Long Island. with houses of worship for Indian religions starting to be built around the larger Indian suburban communities throughout the 1980s and 1990s.

A small Little India did already exist in Manhattan on Lexington Avenue, between 27th and 30th streets around the former Little Armenia spice shop of Kalustyan's, which had become popular among Indian and other South Asian immigrants in the 1960s becoming notable enough to be featured in the New York Daily News as a prime spot for Indian food and groceries by 1976. However, by the 1980s, it was eroding due to increased competition from other Indian districts in Queens which were closer to where the Indian population lived. Hicksville in Nassau County would become the center of the Indian community on Long Island, with Indian stores concentrating on South Broadway around Route 103 by the 2000s. As the 20th century came to a close, this started to change however, with growing concentrations of Indians in areas such as Middlesex County, New Jersey, where 55,000 Indians lived by 2000 and in Jersey City. During the 1990s, these two areas would see their main centers of Indian commerce - Oak Tree Road in Edison, New Jersey, and Newark Avenue in the Journal Square neighborhood in Jersey City become primarily Indian, compared to the 1970s and 1980s, where there was a more of a mixture of businesses. By 1994, there were already over 100 Indian businesses on Oak Tree Road. 

An Indian enclave also emerged in Jackson Heights during the late 20th century, with a strip of Indian stores on 74th Street, though many Indians actually lived in the adjacent, cheaper neighborhood of Elmhurst. Starting in the 1990s, following the path of past generations of New Yorkers, many Indian immigrants starting moving eastward from Queens to more suburban areas of Long Island in the 1990s, including Nassau County towns such as Hicksville, Elmont, East Meadow, and North New Hyde Park seeking bigger homes, better schools, and more space. During the 1990s, Indians were the fastest growing ethnic group on Long Island. Hicksville would become the center of the Indian community on Long Island, with Indian stores concentrating on South Broadway around Route 103 by the 2000s. The Indian American population would also surge in the further reaches of Central New Jersey in the 2000s in towns such as West Windsor, Plainsboro, and Montgomery. The Indian influence in this area manifested itself with the creation of an annual Indian-American fair in Mercer County Park and the creation of cricket fields and leagues in the area. By the 2010s, there were pushes to teach Hindi and have Diwali off at school districts in Central New Jersey. Around this time, there were also a series of home invasions apparently targeting Indians and South Asians in New Jersey, which started to prompt questions about a lack of Indian and more broadly Asian representation in New Jersey's local police forces.

Demographics

The New York-Newark-Bridgeport, NY-NJ-CT-PA Combined Statistical Area, consisting of New York City, Long Island, and adjacent areas within New York State, as well as nearby areas within the states of New Jersey (extending to Trenton), Connecticut (extending to Bridgeport), and including Pike County, Pennsylvania, was home to an estimated 711,174 Indian Americans as of the 2013–2017 American Community Survey by the U.S. Census Bureau, comprising by far the largest Indian American population of any metropolitan area in the United States; New York City itself also contains by far the highest Indian American population of any individual city in North America, estimated at 246,454 as of 2017. At least twenty four Indian American enclaves characterized as a Little India have emerged in the New York City metropolitan area. As of December 2019, Indian airline carrier Air India as well as United States airline carrier United Airlines were offering direct flights from the New York City Metropolitan Area to and from Delhi and Mumbai. Delta Air Lines inaugurated non-stop flight service from JFK International Airport to Mumbai in December 2019.

The Indian American population in the New York City metropolitan region was second in its population as an Asian ethnicity only to the approximately 893,697 uniracial Chinese New Yorkers as of 2017. However, while the presence and growth of the Chinese population is focused on New York City and Long Island in New York State, the gravitas of the Indian population is roughly evenly split between New Jersey and New York State.

Central New Jersey, at the geographic heart of the Northeast Megalopolis, has emerged as the largest hub for Indian immigrants to the U.S., followed closely by Queens and Nassau County on Long Island. Oak Tree Road in Edison and Iselin is known as an Indian dining and shopping destination.

Jersey City in New Jersey has the highest proportion of Asian Indians of any major U.S. city, comprising 10.9% of the overall population of Jersey City in 2010, increasing to 11.4% by 2013. Bergen County, New Jersey and Rockland County, New York are home to the highest concentrations of Malayalis outside of India. Carteret, Middlesex County's Punjabi Sikh community, variously estimated at upwards of 3,000, is the largest concentration of Sikhs in New Jersey. Smaller populations of Asian Indians reside in the Connecticut and Pennsylvania portions of the New York City metropolitan region. Monroe Township, Middlesex County, in central New Jersey, the geographic heart of the Northeast megalopolis and ranked one of the ten safest cities in the United States, has displayed one of the fastest growth rates of its Indian population in the Western Hemisphere, increasing from 256 (0.9%) as of the 2000 Census to an estimated 5,943 (13.6%) as of 2017, representing a 2,221.5% (a multiple of 23) numerical increase over that period, including many affluent professionals and senior citizens as well as charitable benefactors to the Covid-19 relief efforts in India in official coordination with Monroe Township, in addition to Bollywood actors with second homes. By 2022, the Indian population was approaching one-third of Monroe Township’s population, and the nickname Edison-South had developed, in reference to the Little India stature of both townships. A community named Raajipo (meaning happiness) has emerged within nearby Robbinsville, in Mercer County, New Jersey, home of Swaminarayan Akshardham (Devnagari: स्वामिनारायण अक्षरधाम), inaugurated in 2014 as the world's largest Hindu temple. Sikhs have established significant concentrations in Queens and Nassau County in New York and in Middlesex, Bergen, and Hudson counties in New Jersey.

In 2014, 12,350 Indians legally immigrated to the New York-Northern New Jersey-Long Island, NY-NJ-PA core based statistical area; in 2013, this number was 10,818; in 2012, 10,550; 11,256 in 2011; and 11,388 in 2010. These numbers do not include the remainder of the New York-Newark-Bridgeport, NY-NJ-CT-PA Combined Statistical Area. New Jersey is the only U.S. state in which immigrants born in India comprised the largest foreign-born nationality, representing approximately 10% of all foreign-born residents in the state.

New York City boroughs
As the city proper with the largest Asian Indian population in the United States by a wide margin, with an estimated 227,994 individuals as of the 2014 American Community Survey, and as the primary destination for new Indian immigrants, New York City is subdivided into official municipal boroughs, which themselves are home to significant Asian Indian and other South Asian populations. Note that this list includes neither the large Desi populations of Pakistani Americans, Bangladeshi Americans, and Sri Lankan Americans, nor Indo-Caribbean Americans, Afghan Americans, and others of South Asian origin who make their home in New York City. Punjab Avenue (ਪੰਜਾਬ ਐਵੇਨਿਊ), or Little Punjab, has emerged in Richmond Hill, Queens.

Medium and small-sized cities, as of 2021 American Community Survey

New Jersey 
New Jersey, and Middlesex County in Central New Jersey), are home to by far the highest per capita Indian American populations of any U.S. state and U.S. county, respectively, at 3.9% and 14.1%, by 2013 U.S. Census estimates.
Carteret – 13.6%(2012)
Cranbury CDP – 11.5%(2012)
Cranbury Township – 10.5%(2012)
East Windsor – 16.6%
Edison – 36.2%
Franklin – 14.6%(2012)
Fords – 11.1%(2012)
Iselin – 45.1%
Monroe Township, New Jersey – 11.6% (2016)  By 2022, the Indian population was approaching one-third of Monroe Township’s population.
North Brunswick – 16.5%
Parsippany – 24.8%
Piscataway – 18.3%
Plainsboro – 44.7%
Robbinsville CDP – 15.7%(2012)
Secaucus – 22.9%
South Brunswick – 36.3%
West Windsor – 33.8%
Woodbridge – 16.7%

---

New York 
Nassau County on Long Island has become a major suburban destination for Indians:
Bellerose Terrace – 11.8%
Garden City Park – 18.4%
Herricks – 23.5%
Hicksville – 18.7%
Manhasset Hills – 28.4%
Searingtown – 18.1%

List of Little Indias

In New Jersey
 Hudson County
 Bombay, Jersey City, home of India Square
 Newport, Jersey City
 Mercer County
 Robbinsville CDP (15.7% Asian Indian)
 West Windsor (33.8% Asian Indian)
 Middlesex County, with the highest percentage of Asian Indians of any U.S. county, at nearly 20% in 2020
 Monroe Township, with one of the fastest growth rates of its Indian population in the Western Hemisphere, increasing from 256 (0.9%) as of the 2000 Census to an estimated 4,204 (10.0%) as of 2015, representing a 1,542% (multiple of 16) numerical increase over that period. By 2022, the Indian population was approaching one-third of Monroe Township’s population.
 Oak Tree Road, Edison (36.2% Asian Indian)
 Oak Tree Road, Iselin (45.1% Asian Indian)
 Plainsboro (44.7% Asian Indian)
 Route 27, North Brunswick (16.5% Asian Indian)
 Route 27, South Brunswick (36.3% Asian Indian)
 Stelton Road, Piscataway (18.3% Asian Indian)
 Woodbridge Township (16.7% Asian Indian)
 Morris County 
 Route 46, Parsippany (24.8% Asian Indian)
 Somerset County 
 Bridgewater, in the vicinity of a Hindu temple on the central and western parts of the township

Bombay, Jersey City
Bombay, in Jersey City, New Jersey, is home to the highest concentration of Asian Indians in the Western Hemisphere, containing the rapidly growing Indian ethnic enclave of India Square. The neighborhood is centered on Newark Avenue, between Tonnele Avenue and JFK Boulevard, and is considered to be part of the larger Journal Square District. It has had a large concentration of Indian businesses since the 1970s, with about 15,000 Indians living in Jersey City by 1986. This area has been home to the largest outdoor Navratri festivities in New Jersey as well as several Hindu temples. This portion of Newark Avenue is lined with grocery stores, electronics vendors, video stores, import/export businesses, clothing stores, and restaurants, and is one of the busier pedestrian areas of this part of the city, often stopping traffic for hours.  According to the 2000 census, there were nearly 13,000 Indians living in this two-block stretch of Jersey City, up from 3,000 in 1980, increasing commensurately between 2000 and 2010. An annual, color-filled spring Holi festival has taken place in Jersey City since 1992, centered upon India Square and attracting significant participation and international media attention. Although India Square continues to represent the heart of Little India in Jersey City, situated between Tonnele Avenue and John F. Kennedy Boulevard, Little India itself has been expanding further eastward along Newark Avenue, through Jersey City's Little Manila, to Summit Avenue and the Five Corners neighborhood. After dark, the businesses light flashing signs, and the street crowds continue.

Oak Tree Road (Edison/Iselin)
Oak Tree Road is a rapidly growing South Asian-focused commercial strip in Middlesex County, New Jersey, the U.S. county with highest concentration of Asian Indians (nearly 20% in 2020) and the geographic heart of the Northeast megalopolis. The Oak Tree Road strip runs for about one-and-a-half miles through Edison and neighboring Iselin, New Jersey, near the area's sprawling Chinatown and Koreatown. Little India in Edison and Iselin is the largest and most diverse South Asian cultural hub in the United States. The zone is home to over 400 South Asian establishments and businesses, including dining, apparel and electronics retailing, and entertainment. Over 60 Indian and Pakistani restaurants alone are found in the area. In Middlesex County, election ballots are printed in Gujarati, Hindi, and Punjabi as well. Edison was, per 2010 American Community Survey census data, 28.3% ethnic Asian Indian population, the highest percentage for any municipality in the United States. According to the 2017 American Community Survey, 42.6% of Iselin residents identified themselves as being Indian American, the highest percentage for any census-designated place in the United States.

In New York

 Nassau County, Long Island
Bellerose Terrace – 15.2%
Broadway/Route 107, Old Country Road, Hicksville
Garden City Park – 18.1%
Herricks – 23.2%
Manhasset Hills – 18.3%
Searingtown – 18%
 New York City With over 650,000 Indo Americans, the New York City Metropolitan Area contains the largest metropolitan Asian Indian population in the Western Hemisphere.
 Manhattan
 Lexington Avenue, in the neighborhoods of Rose Hill and Murray Hill in Midtown Manhattan, between 25th and 30th Streets (growing preponderance of South Indian cuisine), has become known as Curry Hill, developing rapidly as Manhattan's Indian population nearly doubled between the 2000 and 2010 Census and has continued to increase, to a Census-estimated 27,289 in 2013.
 East 6th Street, in the East Village of Lower Manhattan, between 1st and 2nd Avenues, with many North Indian restaurants, and known as Curry Row.
 Queens
 Flushing, in the vicinity of the Hindu Temple Society of North America
Hillside Avenue, Bellerose Manor
Hillside Avenue, Floral Park
Hillside Avenue, Glen Oaks
Hillside Avenue, Jamaica
73rd and 74th Streets between Roosevelt and 37th Avenues, Jackson Heights
Punjab Avenue (ਪੰਜਾਬ ਐਵੇਨਿਊ), Richmond Hill (Little Punjab)

Culture

Commerce

Indians have a long history of commerce in the United States. In the late 19th and early 20th centuries, many Indians in the United States began to focus on tourism as a source of income. Many tribes opened businesses, such as hotels and Indian grocery stores. Today, Indian-owned businesses in the United States include various enterprises, ranging from small retailers and service providers to large corporations.

Patel Brothers is the world’s large supermarket chain serving the Indian diaspora, with 57 locations in 19 U.S. states—primarily located in the New Jersey/New York Metropolitan Area, due to its large Indian population, and with the East Windsor/Monroe Township, New Jersey location representing the world’s largest and busiest Indian grocery store outside India.

Indian Independence Day Parade
The annual New York City India Day Parade, held on or approximately every August 15 since 1981, is the world's largest Indian Independence Day parade outside of India and is hosted by The Federation of Indian Associations (FIA). According to the website of Baruch College of the City University of New York, "The FIA, which came into being in 1970 is an umbrella organization meant to represent the diverse Indian population of NYC. Its mission is to promote and further the interests of its 500,000 members and to collaborate with other Indian cultural organization. The FIA acts as a mouth piece for the diverse Indian-Asian population in United States, and is focused on furthering the interests of this diverse community. The parade begins on East 38th Street and continues down Madison Avenue in Midtown Manhattan until it reaches 28th Street.  At the review stand on 28th Street, the grand marshal and various celebrities greet onlookers. Throughout the parade, participants find themselves surrounded by the saffron, white and green colors of the Indian flag. They can enjoy Indian food, merchandise booths, live dancing and music present at the Parade. After the parade is over, various cultural organizations and dance schools participate in program on 23rd Street and Madison Avenue until 6PM." The New York/New Jersey metropolitan region's second-largest India Independence Day parade takes place in Little India, Edison/Iselin in Middlesex County, New Jersey, annually in August. Governor of New York Kathy Hochul officially declared August 15, 2022 to be India Independence Day in New York; the governor lauded the accomplishments of Indian Americans in a speech that began with "Namaste" and concluded with "Jai Hind".

Sikh Day Visakhi Parade
The world's largest Sikh Day Parade outside India celebrating Vaisakhi and the season of renewal is held in Manhattan annually in April. The parade is widely regarded as being one of the most colourful parades.

Arts, entertainment, and media
In September 2014, approximately 19,000 Indian Americans attended a speech delivered onstage by Indian Prime Minister Narendra Modi at Madison Square Garden in Midtown Manhattan. This appearance was televised live worldwide and was estimated to have been watched by a billion-strong global audience of Indians in India and overseas. The annual Miss India USA pageant is headquartered in New York City and is often held in Middlesex County, New Jersey or on Long Island. In February 2022, an electronic billboard in Times Square sponsored by the Binder Indian Cultural Center featured a tribute to the late singer Lata Mangeshkar, known as "The Nightingale of India".

News publications in English
 India Abroad
 Little India
 News India Times
 The Indian American
 The South Asian Times
 Tiranga in New Jersey

Languages
Indians in New York and New Jersey, as in the United States as a whole, are highly fluent in English. However, Hindi (हिन्दी), Gujarati (ગુજરાતી), Marathi (मराठी), Punjabi (ਪੰਜਾਬੀ), Bengali (বাাংলা), Tamil (தமிழ்), Telugu (తెలుగు), Malayalam (മലയാളം), Kannada (ಕನ್ನಡ), and Maithili (मैथिली) languages are spoken at home and with local media incorporating these languages available for viewership. In Middlesex County, New Jersey, election ballots are printed in English, Spanish, Bengali, Gujarati, Hindi, and Punjabi.

Cuisine
Indian cuisine is very popular in the New York City metropolitan region, bolstered by the growth of the Asian Indian populace and accompanied by growth in the number of Indian restaurants, located both within and outside of traditional Indian enclaves; such that within New York City proper alone, there are hundreds of Indian restaurants. According to David Shaftel of The New York Times in December 2014, the food at New York City's many Indian chain restaurants is worthy of their flagships in India; the Midtown Manhattan neighborhood south of Murray Hill, namely Rose Hill, has been nicknamed Curry Hill, and provides an abundance of multinational India-based chains specializing in South Indian cuisine. In 2020, CNN Travel claimed that the best Indian food in the United States could be found in Jersey City's India Square.

In 1968, a family of Bengali brothers inaugurated the restaurant Shah Bag at 320 East 6th Street in the East Village of Lower Manhattan, followed by others, with the intention of "making an Indian street". In time, this stretch of East 6th Street between First and Second Avenues evolved the nickname Curry Row, with a dense collection of North Indian restaurants.

By 2000, Indian food food had become ubiquitous in the New York metropolitan area, both inside and outside of Little Indias, with dhabas popping up around the metro area. These dhabas would serve a quickly growing niche of Indian quick-service food, with a particular appeal to Indians working in professions such as a trucking, taxi-driving, importing, and garment dealers. Indian was also getting more attention from the mainstream American press, with some of these dhabas getting reviews from outlets such as The New York Times.

Religion

Parallelling India's religious constituency, most Indians in the New York City metropolitan region practice Hinduism, followed by Islam, Christianity, Sikhism, Buddhism, Jainism, Zoroastrianism, and irreligion. The Hindu Temple Society of North America in Flushing, Queens, is the oldest Hindu temple in the Western Hemisphere, and its canteen feeds 4,000 people a week, with as many as 10,000 during the Diwali (Deepavali) holiday. Further east on Long Island, in Melville, one of the world's largest BAPS temples opened in October 2016. Central New Jersey has large temples of Venkateswara and Guruvayurappan in Bridgewater and Morganville, respectively, and Sai Baba mandirs abound throughout the metropolitan area. BAPS also built the world's largest Hindu temple in Robbinsville, Mercer County, in Central New Jersey. The Robbinsville temple was notably raided by the FBI in 2021 for engaging in forced labor to build the temple. Numerous mosques, churches (geared significantly toward a Keralite membership), Sikh gurudwaras, and Jain temples are also situated in the New York City metropolitan area. The Jain Center of America in Elmhurst, Queens is the oldest Jain temple in the Western hemisphere Many retailers now market Diwali fireworks in the New York City metropolitan region and especially in New Jersey. In September 2021, the State of New Jersey aligned with the World Hindu Council to declare October as Hindu Heritage Month.

Education
Indians have been attaining school board membership positions on various boards of education in New Jersey and on Long Island.

Deepavali/Diwali, Eid/Ramadan as school holidays
Momentum has been growing to recognize the Hindu holy day Deepavali (Diwali) as a holiday on school district calendars in the New York City metropolitan region. New York City announced in October 2022 that Diwali would be an official school holiday commencing in 2023.

Passaic, New Jersey established Diwali as a school holiday in 2005. South Brunswick, New Jersey in 2010 became the first of the many school districts with large Indian student populations in Middlesex County in New Jersey to add Diwali to the school calendar. Glen Rock, New Jersey in February 2015 became the first municipality in Bergen County, with its own burgeoning Indian population post-2010, to recognize Diwali as an annual school holiday, while thousands in Bergen County celebrated the first U.S. county-wide Diwali Mela festival under a unified sponsorship banner in 2016, while Fair Lawn in Bergen County celebrates Holi. Diwali/Deepavali is also recognized by Monroe Township, New Jersey.

Efforts have been undertaken in Millburn, Monroe Township, West Windsor-Plainsboro, Bernards Township, and North Brunswick, New Jersey, Long Island, as well as in New York City, among other school districts in the metropolitan region, to make Diwali a holiday on the school calendar. According to the Star-Ledger, Edison, New Jersey councilman Sudhanshu Prasad has noted parents' engagement in making Deepavali a holiday there; while in Jersey City, the four schools with major Asian Indian populations mark the holiday by inviting parents to the school buildings for festivities. Mahatma Gandhi Elementary School is located in Passaic, New Jersey. Efforts are also progressing toward making Diwali and Eid official holidays at all 24 school districts in Middlesex County. At least 12 school districts on Long Island closed for Diwali in 2022, and over 20 in New Jersey.

In March 2015, New York City Mayor Bill de Blasio officially declared the Muslim holy days Eid al-Fitr and Eid al-Adha holidays on the school calendar. School districts in Paterson and South Brunswick, New Jersey observe Ramadan.

Cricket
Cricket is one of the fastest-growing sports in the New York City metropolitan region. In 2016, a public park was expanded in Monroe Township, Middlesex County in central New Jersey to accommodate a designated cricket pitch, among other recreational facilities. There are similar facilities available in Mercer County Park in West Windsor.

Economic developments

Indian pharmaceutical and technology companies are coming to New Jersey to gain a foothold in the United States. Dr. Reddy's Laboratories, based in Hyderabad, set up its U.S. headquarters in Princeton, New Jersey. Kitex Garments, based in Kerala and India's largest children's clothing manufacturer, opened its first U.S. office in Montvale, New Jersey in October 2015. Pharmaceutical company Aurobindo, also headquartered in Hyderabad, has established its U.S. headquarters in the Dayton section of South Brunswick, Middlesex County, New Jersey, and has implemented a multimillion-dollar expansion of these Central New Jersey operations. In March 2023, Bengaluru-based technology services and consulting company Wipro opened its American international headquarters in East Brunswick, Middlesex, County, New Jersey.

Much like other immigrant groups in the US, Indians have established themselves in a variety of different small businesses in the New York area, with South Asians owning 40% of the gas stations in New York City by the early 1990s and also owning many of New York's newsstands by the mid-1980s. South Asians also make up 50% of New York's taxicab drivers, with Indians such as Bhairavi Desai playing a prominent role in organizing cabbies from the 1990s to the present.

Airline connections with India and the Indian diaspora
A majority of Indian Americans in the New York region are recent immigrants or children of such from India. In that context, travel between the United States and India has developed strong cultural connections, and, in more recent years, business traffic for expatriates. Air India operates nonstop flights from New York JFK to Delhi and Newark Liberty International Airport to Mumbai. United Airlines also operates a nonstop flight from Newark to Mumbai. Meanwhile, Singapore Airlines flies to Changi International Airport in Singapore, where Tamil is one of the official state languages, both from Newark (with one of the longest non-stop flights in the world) and from New York JFK. In May 2019, Delta Air Lines announced non-stop flight service between JFK and Mumbai, to begin on December 22, 2019. American Airlines started operating nonstop service from JFK to Delhi in November 2021.

American Airlines' non-stop flight service codeshared with IndiGo between New York JFK and Delhi began in October 2021. In October 2021, Vistara secured aircraft landing slots at Newark.

Notable people

Arts and culture

 Waris Ahluwalia – fashion designer, actor, and model
 Aziz Ansari – actor, comedian
 Bala Devi Chandrashekar – Bharatanatyam dancer
 Sarita Choudhury – actress
 Nina Davuluri – Miss America 2014
 Sameer Gadhia – lead singer of alternative rock band Young the Giant
 Terry Gajraj – singer
 Rohit Gupta – filmmaker
 Poorna Jagannathan – actress and fashion model
 Norah Jones (Geetali Norah Jones Shankar) – singer-songwriter, musician, and actress
 Vikas Khanna – Michelin Star Chef, Restaurateur, author, Filmmaker and Humanitarian. 
 Ashok Kondabolu – internet personality
 Hari Kondabolu – comedian
 Utsav Lal – pianist, composer, and educator
 Hasan Minhaj – actor and comedian
 Mira Nair – filmmaker
 Kal Penn – actor
 Rachel Roy – fashion designer
 Salman Rushdie – historical fiction novelist
 Rakesh Satyal – novelist
 Suraj Sharma – actor
 Himanshu Suri – rapper

Business

 Anu Aiyengar – global co-head of North American mergers and acquisitions at JPMorgan Chase & Co
 Ajaypal Singh Banga – CEO, MasterCard
 Sant Singh Chatwal – founder of numerous hotel brands including The Chatwal, Dream Hotels, and Time Hotels.
 Vishal Garg – CEO, Better.com
 Ajit Jain – president, Berkshire Hathaway Reinsurance Group
 Anshu Jain – president at Cantor Fitzgerald
 Arvind Krishna – CEO, IBM
 Sandeep Mathrani – CEO, WeWork
 Laxman Narasimhan – CEO of Starbucks Corporation
 Indra Nooyi – CEO of PepsiCo
 Vikram Pandit – former CEO of Citigroup
 Ruchir Sharma – economist, chief global strategist of asset management and emerging markets equity, Morgan Stanley Investment Management

Education

 Viral Acharya – professor of finance, New York University Stern School of Business
 Jagdish Bhagwati –  Columbia University Law School
 Manjul Bhargava – professor of mathematics, Princeton University
 Upmanu Lall – professor, Fu Foundation School of Engineering, Columbia University
 Mahmood Mamdani – professor of political science, Columbia University
 Geeta Menon - professor and previously Dean Emeritus at New York University Stern School of Business
 Arvind Panagariya –  professor, Columbia University, School of International and Public Affairs
 Katepalli Sreenivasan – academic dean of New York University Tandon School of Engineering
 Raghu Sundaram –  Dean of New York University Stern School of Business

Entrepreneurship and technology

 Dhairya Dand – inventor, artist, and designer
 Vikram Joshi – CTO and co-founder of Pulsd
 Roopa Unnikrishnan – innovation consultant

Health

 Dave Chokshi, former Commissioner of Health of the City of New York
 Deepak Chopra – physician, alternative medicine advocate, public speaker, and author
 Siddhartha Mukherjee – hematologist and oncologist, scientist, and Pulitzer Prize winner for General Non-Fiction
 Ashwin Vasan – Commissioner of Health of the City of New York

Law, politics, and diplomacy

 Bhicaji Balsara – first Indian to become a naturalized U.S. citizen
 Ravinder Bhalla – mayor, Hoboken, New Jersey
 Preet Bharara – former U.S. Attorney for the Southern District of New York
 Saikat Chakrabarti – U.S. Congressional aide
 Upendra J. Chivukula – Commissioner, New Jersey Board of Public Utilities 
 Bhairavi Desai – founder and executive director, New York Taxi Workers Alliance
 Vin Gopal – New Jersey State Senator, representing the 11th District in Monmouth County
 Gurbir Grewal – New Jersey's 61st State Attorney General
 Sam Joshi – mayor, Edison, New Jersey
 Shekar Krishnan – New York City councilman, elected in November 2021, representing Jackson Heights and Elmhurst, Queens
 Zohran Mamdani – member, New York State Assembly, representing the 36th District, in Queens
 Raj Mukherji – member, New Jersey General Assembly, representing the 33rd District in Hudson County
 Jenifer Rajkumar – member, New York State Assembly, representing the 38th District, in Queens
 Reshma Saujani – attorney and politician, founder of tech organization Girls Who Code
 Raj Shah – former White House Deputy Press Secretary
 Sterley Stanley –  Assemblyman

Media

 Janaki Chada – Politico
 Rhona Fox – founder, soca music record label Fox Fuse 
 Neeraj Khemlani – executive, Hearst Communications, CBS
 Anna Kodé – real estate and style writer, The New York Times
 Priya Krishna – food writer, The New York Times
 Sukanya Krishnan – news anchor, WNYW 
 Nina Lakhani – The Guardian
 Padma Lakshmi – television host, cookbook author, actress, and model
 Sapna Maheshwari – business journalist, The New York Times
 Apoorva Mandavilli – health and science journalist, The New York Times
 Ved Mehta – late, blind staff writer, The New Yorker
 Seema Mody –  journalist, CNBC
 Vinita Nair – television journalist
 Swapna Venugopal Ramaswamy – National Housing and Economy correspondent, USA TODAY
 Anirban Sen – journalist, Reuters
 Aditi Shrikant – lead psychology reporter, CNBC
 Simran Jeet Singh – journalist, Religion News Service
 Hari Sreenivasan – journalist, anchor, PBS NewsHour Weekend
 Sreenath Sreenivasan – technology journalist
 Ali Velshi – journalist, MSNBC
 Rohit Vyas – journalist
 Fareed Zakaria – journalist, author, and television host, CNN

See also

 Asian Americans in New York City
 Chinese people in New York City
 Curry Row
 Bangladeshis in New York City
 Demographics of New York City
 Filipinos in the New York metropolitan area
 Fuzhounese in New York City
 Japanese in New York City
 Koreans in New York City
 Russians in New York City
 Taiwanese people in New York City

References

Ethnic groups in New York City
Indian-American culture in New York (state)
 
Indian-American history
Asian-American culture in New York (state)
Hinduism in the United States
Sikhism in the United States
Islam in New York (state)
Jainism in the United States
Indian-American culture in New Jersey